Tore Jensen (born 19 May 1935 in Oslo, Norway) is a Norwegian jazz musician (trumpet, cornet and flugelhorn) and bandleader, known from a series of Dixieland bands and album releases.

Career 
Jensen was first known through the local band «Hot Saints» (1953–60), whereupon he was involved in the band «Big Chief Jazzband» and «Norwegian Dixieland All Stars».  Together with Bjørn Stokstad he toured with his own band as in Germany (1961), before the two established the eponymous Stokstad/Jensen Trad.Band (1962–), where all the members was honorary citizen of New Orleans (1984). They also played a series of gigs at Moldejazz from 1963, and a number of festivals and concerts outside Norway. He also worked in a swing jazz quintet with Svein Gusrud and Peter Opsvik, and played on releases by bands like «Norske Rytmekonger», «Swingkameratene», «Christiania 12» and «Mississippi Jazzband». He received Buddyprisen (1987), and was awarded Ellaprisen Oslo Jazzfestival in (2000), bl.s. to have cultivated young musicians within bands like Tore Jensens Shangri-La.

Honors 
1974: Spellemannprisen in the class Jazz, within Stokstad / Jensen Trad.Band for the album Mer Glajazz
1995: Buddyprisen

Discography 
Within Stokstad / Jensen Trad.Band
1973: Glajazz (RCA International), with Laila Dalseth & Wild Bill Davison
1974: Mer Glajazz (RCA International), with Laila Dalseth
1975: Nye gamle
1977: Blanda drops (Hot Club Records
1978: Selvskrevet
1982: Kraftjazz (Talent Records)
1983: Happy New Chair (Hot Club Records), (including Christiania Jazzband on the A-side)
2000: The Originals-1974, with Laila Dalseth & Wild Bill Davison
2002: At the Jazz Band Ball

References 

1935 births
Living people
Musicians from Oslo
Norwegian jazz singers
Norwegian jazz trumpeters
Male trumpeters
20th-century Norwegian trumpeters
21st-century Norwegian trumpeters
20th-century Norwegian male singers
20th-century Norwegian singers
21st-century Norwegian male singers
21st-century Norwegian singers
Male jazz musicians